Wang Feng (born April 17, 1979 in Xintai, Tai'an, Shandong) is a Chinese athlete who competes in diving. He competed for Team China at the 2008 Summer Olympics in Beijing.

He claimed the gold medal at the 2008 World Cup - 3m springboard synchro event. He and Qin Kai are the 2008 Olympic Champions in 3m synchro.

References

External links
 http://2008teamchina.olympic.cn/index.php/personview/personsen/748
 Beijing 2008 Profile

1979 births
Living people
Divers at the 2004 Summer Olympics
Divers at the 2008 Summer Olympics
Olympic divers of China
Olympic gold medalists for China
People from Tai'an
Olympic medalists in diving
Asian Games medalists in diving
Sportspeople from Shandong
Divers at the 2006 Asian Games
Divers at the 2002 Asian Games
Medalists at the 2008 Summer Olympics
World Aquatics Championships medalists in diving
Asian Games gold medalists for China
Asian Games silver medalists for China
Medalists at the 2002 Asian Games
Medalists at the 2006 Asian Games
Universiade medalists in diving
Universiade gold medalists for China
Medalists at the 1999 Summer Universiade
Medalists at the 2001 Summer Universiade
Medalists at the 2003 Summer Universiade
Medalists at the 2005 Summer Universiade